Lax̱g̱altsap  (also Laxqaltsap, and formerly Lachkaltsap) is a Nisg̱a’a village of approximately 474, in the Nass River valley of British Columbia, Canada.
It is one of the four main villages in the Nisg̱a’a Lisims, the formal name for their territory, and is situated on the north side of the Nass River between Gitwinksihlkw to the east and Ging̱olx to the west. It is approximately 24 km from where the Nass empties into the Pacific Ocean at Nass Bay. Road access is via the Nisga'a Highway.

Name origin
In the Nisg̱a’a language, Lax̱g̱altsap translates to "village on village"—the current village was built on the site of a much older one.  The older village at this site, known as Gitxatin, was destroyed by fire.

Lax̱g̱altsap got its English name of Greenville (pron.  ) from Methodist Missionary Alfred Green, who was based here in the late 19th century.

Until reconstituted as a Nisg̱a’a Village in 2000 by the terms of the Nisga'a Treaty, Lax̱g̱altsap was formerly Lachkaltsap Indian Reserve No. 9.

Nisg̱a’a Museum 
The Nisg̱a’a Museum is the Nisg̱a’a people's primary place for display of Nisg̱a’a artifacts, sharing traditions and ideas, and a centre for research and learning. It was established in Lax̱g̱altsap and opened in the spring of 2011.

Education
The community is served by School District 92 Nisga'a and hosts Alvin A. McKay Elementary School.  The secondary school is in Gitlakdamix.

References

External links
School website
Nisgaa Lisims Government
Nisgaa Museum website

Designated places in British Columbia
Nisga'a villages
Nass Country